Kálmán Blahó (3 April 1920 – 24 September 1966) was a Hungarian sprint canoer who competed in the late 1940s. He competed in the K-2 1000 m event at the 1948 Summer Olympics in London, but was disqualified for "hanging" in the wake of another canoe.

References
Kálmán Blahó's profile at Sports Reference.com
Kálmán Blahó's obituary

1920 births
1966 deaths
Canoeists at the 1948 Summer Olympics
Hungarian male canoeists
Olympic canoeists of Hungary
20th-century Hungarian people